The Marketed Health Products Directorate (MHPD) is the Canadian federal authority that monitors the safety and effectiveness of health products marketed in Canada. These include:
 Prescription and non-prescription medications
 Biologic medical products, including fractionated blood products
 Therapeutic and diagnostic vaccines
 Natural health products;
 Radiopharmaceutical products
 Medical devices
 Cells, tissues and organs

As part of Health Canada, MHPD collects and analyzes reports of adverse health product reactions through its network of regional reporting centres and disseminates new health product safety information.

References

External links
Marketed Health Products Directorate (official website)
Health Canada. "Marketed Health Products Directorate: Retrospective - The First Five Years | 2002-2007"

Federal departments and agencies of Canada
Health Canada
Canada